Sorgir ("Sorrows" or "Griefs" in Icelandic) is the fifth full-length album by the Icelandic viking/folk metal band Skálmöld, released on 12 October 2018 via Napalm Records.

Concept and recording
The album is divided into two parts. The first four tracks are labeled Sagnir (Tales) and each tell a tragic story. Track number five to eight are labeled Svipir (Ghosts) and tell the same stories, but from the perspective of the ghosts who caused the disastrous events. The names of the Svipir tracks are taken from the names of mythological beings.

Sorgir was made two years after Skálmöld's previous album Vögguvísur Yggdrasils. The band described the creation process as quick and raw. The album was produced by Einar Vilberg and recorded at the studio Hljóðverk in Reykjavík.

Reception
Arnar Eggert Thoroddsen of RÚV wrote that the album stays within its genre conventions but is the band's most varied to date. He highlighted the song "Skotta", which reminded him of "Metallica's best song, 'Disposable Heroes'". Metal.de complimented the fast solos and rhythm structures, and wrote that the best part was the "melodic offensive" of the last two tracks, "Móri" and "Mara". Metal Hammers Dom Lawson wrote: "Whether in full-on longboat assault mode on the marauding, mid-paced Lsjósið or exploring more expansive dynamics on closing tour-de-force Mara, the power of the message and the sincerity of the messengers carries every stirring ensemble splurge forward to Valhalla with maximum uplift."

Track listing

PersonnelSkálmöld Snæbjörn Ragnarsson – bass, vocals
 Jón Geir Jóhannsson – drums, vocals
 Baldur Ragnarsson – guitar, vocals
 Þráinn Árni Baldvinsson – guitar, vocals
 Gunnar Ben – keyboards, oboe
 Björgvin Sigurðsson – vocals, guitarGuests'
 Óttarr Proppé – vocals on track 5
 Ragnheiður Steindórsdóttir – vocals on track 7

References

2018 albums
Skálmöld albums
Napalm Records albums
Ghosts in popular culture